Legendrea is a genus of extremely rare ciliates first described by French  biologist Fauré-Fremiet in 1908, rediscovered and re-examined in 2022.

Classification 
The genus has 5 species including the type species, Legendrea loyezae, described in 1908. Other genera (e.g. Lacerus and Thysanomorpha) were only distinguished from Legendrea by their physical appearance, not affinities. These genera were misidentifications and were synonymised with Legendrea along with their respective species. First true taxonomic assignment of the cilliate was made in December 2022. The current 5 species are:
Legendrea bellerophon  [=Thysanomorpha bellerophon ]
Legendrea crassa  [=Penardiella crassa ]
Legendrea interrupta 
Legendrea loyezae 
Legendrea pespelicani  [=Lacerus pespelicani ]

Taxonomic affinities  
The genus (and species) are distinguishable from one another by the length of their finger-like tentacles. These tentacles are located at the rear end of the animal. Descriptions of the animal vary from one another, and the reasoning is unknown. Phylogenetic analysis of the 18S rRNA gene within L. loyezae placed the genus within the family Spathidiidae taxonomically ranked under the order of Haptorida. A shorter gene of 18S rRNA was used to classify the species and so its affinity should be carefully interpreted with there being the likelihood of it changing to a new affinity. The sequence used to determine the identity of L. loyezae implies that it forms a sister group with the sequences from the re-identified Epispathidium papilliferum as well as an undescribed species of the same genus. The Epispathidium possessed protruding papillae that are analogous to those found on L. loyezae, although the papillae on Epispathidium were only present on its oral region.

A. Jankowski 
A. Jankowski didn't observe any of the actual members of Legendrea. Jankowski published a revision of the genus and in turn divided Legendrea into two genera; Lacerus and Thysanomorpha. The differences between the species in Legendrea, Legendrea  bellerophon, put it within the genus Thysanomorpha and was named Thysanomorpha bellerophon. Jankowski re-described the species as having a serrated body edge/surface with an uneven series of outgrowths with trichomes. The names of the species and genera are not accepted and are considered as being mere misidentifications of the Legendrea's species.

References 

Ciliates
Ciliate genera
Microscopic eukaryotes
Microscopic animals
Taxa described in 1908